Ľudovít Lačný (December 8, 1926 – December 25, 2019) was a Slovak chess problem composer and judge.

He was born in Banská Štiavnica and studied mathematics, working as a teacher, and as a computer programmer.

In 1956 he was appointed an International Judge of Chess Compositions and in 2005 was awarded the International Master for Chess Composition title. He is best known as the eponym of the Lacny cycle, according to the theme invented by him in 1949.

External links
Lacny's page on Juraj Lorinc's website

References

Chess composers
Slovak chess players
1926 births
2019 deaths
People from Banská Štiavnica
International Judges of Chess Compositions